The Janice Peaslee Bridge (formerly known as the Maidstone-Stratford Hollow Bridge) is a pin-connected steel & wrought iron Pratt through truss bridge crossing the Connecticut River between Stratford, New Hampshire and Maidstone, Vermont.

History and construction 
The bridge was originally completed in 1893 by the Berlin Iron Bridge Company, East Berlin, Connecticut.  It was closed "temporarily" in 1990 for safety reasons.  Due to the perseverance of Vermont State Representative Janice L. Peaslee, it underwent a total rebuild which was completed in 2005.

In order to facilitate reconstruction of the abutments, the bridge was placed on land for repairs while the foundations were rebuilt and a new approach was created.

Since the bridge was resurrected as a result of Janice Peaslee's efforts, the bridge was renamed in her honor in 2006.

Image gallery

See also 
 List of crossings of the Connecticut River

References

External links

Bridges over the Connecticut River
Buildings and structures in Maidstone, Vermont
Bridges completed in 1893
Bridges completed in 2005
Bridges in Coös County, New Hampshire
Bridges in Essex County, Vermont
Road bridges in New Hampshire
Road bridges in Vermont
Wrought iron bridges in the United States
Steel bridges in the United States
1893 establishments in New Hampshire
1893 establishments in Vermont
Interstate vehicle bridges in the United States